Nour ed-Din Mohammad Esfahani (died 1683) was a prominent Persian calligrapher. He lived in the 17th century. He was from Isfahan. He was Aboutorab Esfahani's son and Mohammad Saleh Esfahani's brother, who were both also famous calligraphers. He died in 1683.

References 

Year of birth unknown
1683 deaths
Artists from Isfahan
17th-century calligraphers of Safavid Iran
17th-century Iranian people